Cícero Santos (born 26 August 1984), simply known as Cícero, is a Brazilian professional footballer who plays as a central or attacking midfielder.

Career

Early career
During his time at Fluminense, Cícero proved himself to be a versatile player. He featured as an attacking midfielder, a defensive midfielder, a wide player and a striker. Cícero featured heavily in Fluminense's Copa Libertadores Campaign of 2008, scoring vital goals in the group stages, including a beautiful free kick in the 6–0 demolition of Arsenal de Sarandí at the Maracaña in Rio de Janeiro. Cícero was the only Flu player to convert his penalty kick during the shoot out in the final defeat against LDU Quito of Ecuador.

Hertha BSC
Cicero made his Bundesliga debut for Hertha on 17 August 2008 against Eintracht Frankfurt. He established himself as a regular, playing all but one game in the 2008–09 season.

São Paulo
After one and half-year playing for São Paulo, on 1 January 2013, Brazilian press confirmed that Cícero would break his contract with the club for 2013 season.

Santos 
On 8 January 2013, Cícero signed a two-year deal with Santos. Cícero finished the 2013 Campeonato Paulista as the club's second topscorer, only behind Neymar.

Fluminense 
In July 2014, Cícero re-joined Fluminense for his third spell at the club.

Return to São Paulo 
In December 2016, Cícero has returned to São Paulo. After Cícero scored a hat-trick against PSTC, in a 4–2 winning match valid for 2017 Copa do Brasil, coach Rogério Ceni praised him as a key player of squad. According to Ceni: "He is a 32-year-old player, that adds experience, with a good head game and a good finalization from out of area."

Grêmio 
After the sacking of São Paulo manager Rogerio Ceni, Cícero received less playtime, eventually leading to a mutual contract termination. He soon after signed with Grêmio in order to bolster their squad for continental play.

Botafogo 
In February 2019, Cícero joined Botafogo on a free transfer.

Career statistics

Honours
Figueirense
Campeonato Catarinense: 2006

Fluminense
Copa do Brasil: 2007
Primeira Liga : 2016

São Paulo
Copa Sudamericana: 2012

Grêmio
Copa Libertadores: 2017
Recopa Sudamericana: 2018

References

External links
 
 

1984 births
Living people
Sportspeople from Espírito Santo
Brazilian footballers
Association football midfielders
Campeonato Brasileiro Série A players
Campeonato Brasileiro Série B players
Tombense Futebol Clube players
Esporte Clube Bahia players
Figueirense FC players
Fluminense FC players
São Paulo FC players
Santos FC players
Grêmio Foot-Ball Porto Alegrense players
Botafogo de Futebol e Regatas players
Bundesliga players
Hertha BSC players
VfL Wolfsburg players
Qatar Stars League players
Al-Gharafa SC players
Brazilian expatriate footballers
Brazilian expatriate sportspeople in Germany
Brazilian expatriate sportspeople in Qatar
Expatriate footballers in Germany
Expatriate footballers in Qatar